Renfro is a surname of Scottish origin, and a variant of Renfrew. Notable people with the surname include:

Alfred T. Renfro (1877–1964), American artist
Brad Renfro (1982–2008), American actor
Elza T. Renfro (1902–1935), American football, basketball, and baseball player and coach
Julia Renfro, Aruban journalist
Leonard Renfro (born 1970), American football player
Marli Renfro (born 1938), American model and actress
Mel Renfro (born 1941), American football player
Mike Renfro (born 1955), American football player
Ray Renfro (1929–1997), American football player
Raye Renfro (1940–1978), American football player and athlete
Will Renfro (1932–2010), American football player
Carter Renfro (2003 - ),
American Football player

See also
 Renfroe, surname
 Renfrow (surname)

References

Surnames of Scottish origin